Wolfgang Nußbücker (born 22 September 1936) is a German organ builder, cantor and founder of the organ building workshop "Mecklenburger Orgelbau" operating in Plau am See.

Life 
Born  in Thüringen, After completing his vocational training, Nußbücker worked for Löbling in Erfurt from 1950 to 1953 with Lothar Heinze in Stadtilm. After completing his master's examination in 1964 with the construction of the new organ in the then Catholic church St. Sigismund Plaue, Nußbücker founded an organ building company in Erfurt in 1965. In 1966, he settled in Plau am See in Mecklenburg.

In the following 25 years, an organ building workshop was established in the GDR. This was sometimes difficult due to a lack of materials, tools and suppliers. In the course of this, a pipe workshop was also built. The organ-building workshop became known in particular for the large number of small organs, positive and basso continuo instruments produced. More than 150 new organs were built during Nußbücker's creative period. Of the 24 organ building companies in the GDR, Nußbücker was the only one based in the three Nordbezirkes. In 1991, the name was changed to Mecklenburger Orgelbau/Wolfgang Nußbücker. Since 1999, the master organ builder and son-in-law Andreas Arnold is the new owner of the organ building company Mecklenburger Orgelbau.

New organ buildings (selection)

Organ restorations (selection) 

 Friedrich Friese II organ of the ev.-luth.  2008 (Cooperation with Firma Jehmlich)
 Marcus Runge organ of the ev.-luth. Kirche Buchholz/ Ziesendorf 2007
 Barnim Grüneberg organ of the  2005 (cooperation with Firma Scheffler)
 Grüneberg Organ of the  2005
 Albert Hollenbach Organ of the Siechenhauskapelle Neuruppin 2004
 Friedrich Friese III organ of the ev.-luth. Kirche Bülow 2003
 Friese-III organ of the ev.-luth.  2003
 Friedrich Friese I organ of the ev.-luth. Kirche Lübtheen 2002
 Johann Michael Röder organ of the  1999 (cooperation with Firma Wegscheider)
 Runge organ of the Klosterkirche Rehna 1996
 Organ of the

References

Further reading 
 Hermann Fischer: 100 Jahre Bund deutscher Orgelbaumeister (1892–1991), Festschrift Orgelbau-Fachverlag Lauffen, 1991
 Wolfgang Nußbücker: Als selbständiger Orgelbauer in der DDR; '' 27, 135–146, 2001

External links 

 
 Plauer Orgelbauwerkstatt vor 50 Jahren gegründet (Die Welt)

 

German pipe organ builders
1936 births
Living people